Laurence Johnson may refer to:

Laurence F. Johnson (born 1950), American futurist, author, and educator
Laurence A. Johnson, owner of supermarkets in Syracuse, New York
Laurence Johnson (cricketer) (born 1936), English former cricketer
Laurie Johnson (born 1927), English film and television composer, and bandleader

See also
Lawrence Johnson (disambiguation)